Shoplifters is a 2018 Japanese drama film directed, written and edited by Hirokazu Kore-eda. Starring Lily Franky and Sakura Ando, it is about a family that relies on shoplifting to cope with a life of poverty.

Kore-eda wrote the screenplay contemplating what makes a family, and inspired by reports on poverty and shoplifting in Japan. Principal photography began in mid-December 2017.

Shoplifters premiered on 13 May 2018 at the Cannes Film Festival, where it won the Palme d'Or. The film was released in Japan on 8 June 2018 and was a critical and commercial success. Shoplifters won three Mainichi Film Awards, including Best Film, and the Asia Pacific Screen Award for Best Feature Film, and was nominated for Best Foreign Language Film at the Oscars and the Golden Globes.

Plot
In Tokyo, a family live together in poverty: Hatsue, an elderly woman who owns the home and supports them with her deceased husband's pension, Nobuyo, who works for an industrial laundry service, her husband Osamu, a day laborer forced to leave his job after twisting his ankle, Aki, who works at a fetish club, and Shota, a young boy.

Osamu and Shota routinely shoplift from stores, using a system of hand signals to communicate. Osamu tells Shota it is fine to steal things that have not been sold, as they do not belong to anyone. One cold night, they see Yuri, a neighborhood girl they regularly observe locked out on an apartment balcony, and bring her home with them. They only intend to have her stay for dinner, but after finding evidence of abuse, they choose not to return her.

Yuri bonds with her new family and learns to shoplift from Osamu and Shota. Osamu urges Shota to see him as his father and Yuri as his sister, but Shota is reluctant. The family learns on television that after almost two months, police are investigating Yuri's disappearance; her parents never reported her missing. The family cuts her hair, burns her old clothes, and renames her Lin.

Hatsue visits her husband's son from an affair, from whom she regularly receives money. The son and his wife are Aki's parents; they lie that their daughter is living in Australia. The family visits the beach and Hatsue expresses contentment that she will not die a lonely death. At home that night, she dies in her sleep. Osamu and Nobuyo bury her under the house in order to avoid reporting her death and continue to collect her pension.

Osamu steals a purse from a car, making Shota feel uneasy, since he considers this theft against their moral code. Shota recalls joining the family after Nobuyo and Osamu found him in a locked car. Increasingly guilt-ridden about teaching Yuri to steal, Shota interrupts her theft by stealing fruit from a grocery store in view of the staff. Cornered, he jumps from a bridge and breaks his leg.

Shota is hospitalized and detained by police. Nobuyo and Osamu are caught after attempting to flee with Yuri and Aki. The authorities discover Yuri and the death of Hatsue and tell Shota that the family was going to abandon him. They reveal to Aki that Nobuyo and Osamu previously killed Nobuyo's abusive husband in a crime of passion, and that Hatsue was receiving money from Aki's parents.

Nobuyo takes the blame for the crimes to protect Osamu, who has a previous criminal record, and is sentenced to prison. Shota is placed in an orphanage. Osamu and Shota visit Nobuyo in prison, and she gives Shota details of the car they found him in so he can search for his parents. Shota stays overnight with Osamu, against the orphanage's rules. When Shota asks, Osamu tells him the truth, confirming that they intended to abandon him, and says he can no longer be his father.

The next morning, as he is about to depart, Shota says that he allowed himself to be caught. Osamu runs after Shota's bus; Shota looks back and finally acknowledges Osamu as his father. Yuri is returned to her parents, who continue to neglect her, and looks wistfully back at the house she shared with the family.

Cast

Production
Director Hirokazu Kore-eda said that he developed the story for Shoplifters when considering his earlier film Like Father, Like Son, with the question "What makes a family?" He had been considering a film exploring this question for 10 years before making Shoplifters. Kore-eda described it as his "socially conscious" film. With this story, Kore-eda said he did not want the perspective to be from only a few individual characters, but to capture "the family within the society", a "wide point of view" in the vein of his 2004 film Nobody Knows. He set his story in Tokyo and was also influenced by the Japanese Recession, including media reports of how people lived in poverty and of shoplifting. To research the project, Kore-eda toured an orphanage and wrote a scene inspired by a girl there who read from Swimmy by Leo Lionni. Kore-eda said,

Lily Franky and Sakura Ando joined the cast before principal photography began in mid-December 2017. Child actors Sasaki Miyu and Jyo Kairi were cast for their first film. Sosuke Ikematsu, Chizuru Ikewaki and Yūki Yamada joined the cast in February.  It was also one of the last films Kirin Kiki appeared in before her death in 2018.

Production began in December 2017, with Fuji Television Network, Gaga, and AOI Pro producing.  Cinematographer Kondo Ryuto used 35 mm film with an Arricam ST, aware 35 mm was a preference of Kore-eda's and also seeking the right texture and grain for the story.

Release
With Gaga Corporation as its distributor, the film was selected to screen at the 2018 Cannes Film Festival, where it went on to win the Palme d'Or. In Japan, it was scheduled for release on 8 June 2018. Magnolia Pictures also obtained the rights to distribute the film in North America. On 23 May 2018, Thunderbird Releasing acquired the UK distribution rights, while Road Pictures secured the rights to distribute it in China.

Reception

Box office
The film grossed  in Japan by the end of 2018, making it the fourth highest-grossing domestic film of the year and the second highest-grossing Japanese live-action film of the year (after Code Blue). In China, the film grossed , in what The Hollywood Reporter called "an unprecedentedly strong performance for an imported pure arthouse drama". This makes it the most successful commercially of the five nominees for the 2019 Academy Award for Best International Film.It scored China Box Office Record.

In its tenth weekend of release in the United States and Canada, following its Oscar nomination, the film made $190,000 from 114 theaters, for a running total of $2.5 million up until then.

Home media 
In the United Kingdom, it was 2019's fourth best-selling foreign language film on home video, below the Hayao Miyazaki anime films Spirited Away, My Neighbor Totoro and Princess Mononoke.

Critical response

The website's critical consensus reads, "Understated yet ultimately deeply affecting, Shoplifters adds another powerful chapter to director Hirokazu Kore-eda's richly humanistic filmography." On Metacritic, the film has a weighted average score of 93 out of 100, based on 40 critics, indicating "universal acclaim". Shoplifters was also listed on numerous critics' top ten lists for 2018.

Peter Bradshaw of The Guardian gave Shoplifters 4/5 stars, declaring it a "rich, satisfying film", but subsequently upgraded this to a 5/5 star review upon second viewing. The Guardian later ranked the film 15th in its Best Films of the 21st Century list. The Hollywood Reporter critic Deborah Young called it "bittersweet" as it "contrasts the frigid emotions of socially correct behavior with the warmth and happiness of a dishonest lower-class family". Robbie Collin of The Daily Telegraph awarded it five stars, hailing it as an "outstanding domestic drama, crafted by Kore-eda with crystalline insight and an unsparing emotional acuity".

For IndieWire, David Ehrlich gave it a grade of "A−" and wrote the film "stings" with "the loneliness of not belonging to anyone, and the messiness of sticking together". TheWraps Ben Croll declared it Kore-eda's "richest film to date". In Time Out, Geoff Andrew gave it four stars and saluted Kore-eda as "a modern-day Ozu". Varietys Maggie Lee also compared it to Oliver Twist by Charles Dickens; Lily Franky's character Osamu was likewise compared to Dickens' character Fagin.

In Japan, The Japan Times gave Shoplifters five stars, writing "The cheers are entirely deserved" and credited it for an "outwardly naturalistic" style.

Accolades
The film competed at the Cannes Film Festival, where it won the Palme d'Or on 19 May. It was the first Japanese Palme d'Or-winner since The Eel in 1997. Jury president Cate Blanchett explained the decision: "We were completely bowled over by Shoplifters. How intermeshed the performances were with the directorial vision". In July 2018, Shoplifters also won Best International Film at the Munich Film Festival, with the jury citing it by stating it "opens up new possibilities and ultimately offers [...] hope".

In August, Shoplifters was selected as the Japanese entry for the Best Foreign Language Film at the 91st Academy Awards. It made the December shortlist in 2018, before being nominated for the Academy Award in January 2019.

See also
 List of submissions to the 91st Academy Awards for Best Foreign Language Film
 List of Japanese submissions for the Academy Award for Best Foreign Language Film
 Parasite, a 2019 South Korean film about the wealth gap and class divide in an East Asian country. The film has been frequently compared to Shoplifters

Notes

References

External links
 

2018 films
2018 drama films
Japanese drama films
2010s Japanese-language films
Films about families
Films about missing people
Films about poverty
Films about theft
Films directed by Hirokazu Kore-eda
Films set in Tokyo
Palme d'Or winners
Best Foreign Film César Award winners
Best Foreign Film Guldbagge Award winners
Asian Film Award for Best Film winners
Films with screenplays by Hirokazu Kore-eda
2010s Japanese films